Kohlu-ye Olya (also Romanized as Kohlū-ye ‘Olyā and Kahloo Olya; also known as Kholeh Bāla, Kohlū, Kohlū Bālā, and Kohlū-ye Bālā) is a village in Rudbar Rural District, in the Central District of Tafresh County, Markazi Province, Iran. At the 2006 census, its population was 248, in 84 families.

References 

Populated places in Tafresh County